Eumida is a genus of polychaetes belonging to the family Phyllodocidae.

The genus has cosmopolitan distribution.

Species:

Eumida albopicta 
Eumida alkyone 
Eumida alvini 
Eumida angolensis 
Eumida arctica 
Eumida asterope 
Eumida bahusiensis 
Eumida caspersi 
Eumida delicata 
Eumida dracodermica 
Eumida elektra 
Eumida fenwicki
Eumida fuscoculata 
Eumida hawksburyensis 
Eumida kelaino 
Eumida longicirrata 
Eumida longicornuta 
Eumida mackiei 
Eumida macrophthalma 
Eumida maia 
Eumida merope 
Eumida minuta 
Eumida muriatica 
Eumida notata 
Eumida nuchala 
Eumida ockelmanni 
Eumida ophiuricola 
Eumida parva 
Eumida punctifera 
Eumida quadrocula 
Eumida sanguinea 
Eumida schanderi
Eumida strigata 
Eumida taygete 
Eumida thunbergi
Eumida trifasciata 
Eumida tubiformis 
Eumida uschakovi

References

Annelids